Cosmo Buono is an American pianist, native of New Jersey who completed his piano studies at New York University, Bard College, and The Juilliard School. As a soloist he has been heard in North America, Europe, and Japan, including performances with the Munich Philharmonic and the Danish State Radio Orchestra. He is also the founder of Alexander and Buono International.

Sources
 https://www.nytimes.com/1992/11/29/nyregion/music-duo-pianists-offering-rare-transcriptions.html?scp=2&sq=Cosmo+Buono&st=nyt
 https://www.nytimes.com/1982/06/06/arts/piano-bradshaw-buono-duo.html
 https://www.nytimes.com/1999/12/31/movies/classical-music-and-dance-guide.html

External links
 The Bradshaw & Buono International Piano Competition - official website
 The Alexander & Buono Competitions - official website
 Alexander & Buono International - official website

Living people
Steinhardt School of Culture, Education, and Human Development alumni
Bard College alumni
Juilliard School alumni
American male pianists
21st-century American pianists
21st-century American male musicians
Year of birth missing (living people)